Mohamed Ali Abdul Razzak (born 1933) is an Iraqi high jumper. He competed in the 1960 Summer Olympics.

References

External links
 

1933 births
Living people
Athletes (track and field) at the 1960 Summer Olympics
Iraqi male athletes
Olympic athletes of Iraq
Sportspeople from Basra